G-man (short for "government man", plural G-men) is an American slang term for agents of the United States Government. It is especially used as a term for an agent of the Federal Bureau of Investigation (FBI).

G-man is also a term used for members of G Division, a Dublin Metropolitan Police unit operating out of Dublin Castle prior to Irish independence in 1922. Colonel Ned Broy uses the term in his official testimony for the Irish Army's Bureau of Military History in their archive of the Easter Rising (1916) and the Irish War of Independence (1919–1921).

Origins and use in media
 According to the Merriam-Webster Dictionary, the term "G-man" was first used in the year 1928.
 The earliest citation in the Oxford English Dictionary for the American usage of the term "G-man" was in 1930, from a biography of Al Capone by F. D. Pasley.
 In popular legend, the term originated during the September 1933 arrest of the gangster George "Machine Gun" Kelly by agents of the Bureau of Investigation (BOI), a forerunner of the FBI. Finding himself unarmed, Kelly supposedly shouted, "Don't shoot, G-men! Don't shoot!", although this is probably a fabrication.
 The term was the basis of the title for the 1935 film G Men, starring James Cagney, which was one of the top-grossing films of that year.
 Kelly's surrender is dramatized in the 1959 film The FBI Story. The encounter with Kelly is similarly dramatized in the 1973 film Dillinger. The film was followed by a 1974 television film titled Melvin Purvis: G-Man.
 During Season 3 of That Girl in the 1969 episode "Many Happy Returns" Ann Marie is faced with a sudden audit from the IRS. She refers to the income tax person as a G-Man.
 The Spanish Rock band Hombres G got its name in 1983 from the Spanish translation of "G-man" and after the James Cagney film G Men.
 In the Half-Life video game series (1998—), one of the main characters is a "sinister interdimensional bureaucrat" called the G-Man. Dressed in a suit and tie, and often carrying a briefcase, he speaks in a cryptic manner, and periodically intervenes to store or utilise the player character, Gordon Freeman, to shape events.
 The 2011 film J. Edgar includes a reference to the surrender scene in the 1959 film The FBI Story.
 In the 2011 film X-Men: First Class, Charles Xavier refers to his team as the "G-Men", but Moira MacTaggart states that they are something different, and decides to name the team "X-Men". Charles finds the name amusing and keeps it.

See also

G.I.
FBI portrayal in media
Noun definition of "fed"
Society of Former Special Agents of the Federal Bureau of Investigation
Men in Black
G-Man (Half-Life)

References

Slang
Federal Bureau of Investigation
1920s neologisms
1930s slang
1940s slang
1950s slang
American slang
South African slang
Dublin Metropolitan Police